Hanchinala (also written Hanchinal) is a village in the Saundatti taluka of Belgaum district in Karnataka. In 2001, it had a population of 6232 with 3189 males and 3043 females.

References
AMS Maps of India and Pakistan

Village code= 112400 "Census of India : Villages with population 5000 & above". http://www.censusindia.gov.in/Census_Data_2001/Village_Directory/Population_data/Population_5000_and_Above.aspx. Retrieved 2008-12-18.

Villages in Belagavi district